The Northern Counties East Football League is a semi-professional English football league. It has two divisions – Premier Division and Division One – which stand at the ninth and tenth levels of the football pyramid respectively.

History
The league was formed in 1982 following the merger of the Yorkshire League and Midland League. For its inaugural season, the league consisted of five divisions. Since then, the league has undergone several changes to the point where since 2018 it has two divisions of 20 teams.

The league has maintained promotion and relegation between its divisions since its beginning. In 2015 a series of play-offs were introduced for the first time to determine a third promotee from Division One.

The competition has several feeder leagues at level 11 of the pyramid, which may provide new member clubs each year:
 Central Midlands League North Division
 Humber Premier League Premier Division
 Lincolnshire League
 Sheffield and Hallamshire County Senior League Premier Division
 West Yorkshire League Premier Division
 York League Premier Division
 Yorkshire Amateur League Supreme Division
Clubs are also liable to be transferred to other leagues if the FA deems it geographically suitable to do so.

Current clubs (2022–23)

Premier Division

Division One

Honours

Champions

Promoted
Since the league's formation in 1982, the following clubs have won promotion to higher levels of the English football league system – normally to the Northern Premier League –

Cup competitions

League Cup
The league currently has just one cup competition, the League Cup, which is contested by every club in the league.

Finals

President's Cup and Trophy
In the past the league has had additional cup competitions. The Trophy was contested by the Division One clubs and the President's Cup which featured the top eight teams in each division from the previous season, provided they remain in the league.

Winners

Member clubs in national competitions

FA Cup First Round
The following NCEL clubs have reached the First Round proper of the FA Cup –

FA Vase finalists
The following NCEL clubs have reached the Final of the FA Vase –

References

External links
 Official site
 NCEFL at the Football Club History Database

 
1982 establishments in England
9
Sports leagues established in 1982
Football competitions in Yorkshire